Louise Jacob de Montfleury, stage name Mademoiselle Dupin (fl. 1672 – 1685), was a French stage actress. 

She was engaged at the Molière's company in 1672. She became a member of the Sociétaires of the Comédie-Française in 1680. She retired in 1685. 

She was most known for her tragic parts.

References

External links 
   Mademoiselle Dupin, Comédie-Française

17th-century births
Year of birth unknown
Year of death unknown
17th-century French actresses
French stage actresses